Katariya is a village in Ghazipur district of Uttar Pradesh, India. It comes under the Varachakwar block and is administered by a panchayat.

References

Cities and towns in Ghazipur district